I'm With Lucy is a 2002 romantic comedy directed by Jon Sherman starring Monica Potter in the title role, with Henry Thomas, David Boreanaz, Anthony LaPaglia, Gael García Bernal and John Hannah.

Plot 
Lucy is a journalist who is dumped by her "perfect" boyfriend and then goes on a series of dates with five different men—in January Doug, an entomologist; in May Gabriel, a successful playwright; in July Bobby, a former baseball player; in September Barry, a computer store owner; and in December Luke, an orthopedic doctor.

Lucy acts differently around each of the men—she is drunk on her date with Doug; she uncharacteristically jumps into bed with Gabriel; she is, at first, irritated with but then moved by ex-baseball star Bobby; her date with Barry gets off to a rough start, but then while on their date, they run into her parents and end up having dinner with them; and her date with Luke is sidetracked when they see a colleague of his who is with his daughter, Eve, who appears to have her own eye on Luke.

Both Lucy and Doug are on the rebound, they don't connect but she does get him to come out of his shell by the end of the date.

She takes Bobby to several places that put him completely out of his element and then he takes her to a baseball card show where she sees a different side of him.

Lucy's date with Gabriel essentially becomes a one-night stand when she realizes he isn't what she wants in life.

She becomes serious with Luke, but an incident at a restaurant in which he is rude to one of the waiters makes her realize he isn't who she wants, either.

Barry surprises her several times throughout the movie with touching and thoughtful gestures, which of course win her over in the end.

Cast
 Monica Potter as Lucy
 Henry Thomas as Barry
 David Boreanaz as Luke
 Anthony LaPaglia as Bobby
 John Hannah as Doug
 Gael García Bernal as Gabriel
 Harold Ramis as Jack
 Julie Christie as Dori
 Robert Klein as Dr. Salkind
 Julie Gonzalo as Eve
 Julianne Nicholson as Jo
 Flora Martínez as Melissa
 Craig Bierko as Peter
 Linda Halaska as Saleslady

Production
Budgeted with $15 million, I'm with Lucy started filming on April 16, 2001. The film was shot in New York City and in Florida.

Reception
Lisa Nesselson of Variety wrote: "Performances are sharper than the material in I'm With Lucy, a moderately diverting comedy. Although Monica Potter is versatile and amusing in the title role, pic feels like a string of incidents rather than a full-bodied narrative."

References

External links 
 
 
 

2002 romantic comedy films
2002 films
Films set in Miami
Films set in New York City
Films shot in Florida
Films shot in New York City
American romantic comedy films
2000s English-language films
2000s American films